Federal Government Girls College, Benin (FGGC Benin) is a federal government funded girls institution that prepares young girls for the future. FGGC Benin is located in Benin City, Edo State in the midwestern region of Nigeria, West Africa.

History

Federal Government Girls' College, Benin City, Edo State, Nigeria was founded by the Federal Government of Nigeria on 15 October 1973, with initial student membership of about 72. The college was one of the first set of 13 unity schools established that year and was at the forefront of improving female education in Nigeria .

FGGC Benin which was initially at its temporary site at Idia College in 1973 moved to its current permanent site located very close to the University of Benin Teaching Hospital (UBTH) in September 1975 and has a road named after it (Federal Road). Her first principal was Miss R. Bokdawala.

Previous principals of the school include Ms Pelly, Mrs Omigie, Mrs Obiennu, Mrs Oligbo, Mrs Nnamme, Mrs Gladys Ekhabafe, Mrs Omogbai-Osyka, Mrs Eza, Mrs Ajila, Mrs P.U Erhahon, Mrs Falashinnu, Mrs Kez Okeke and Mrs VV Pam.

College life
It has passed through its own vicissitudes due to varying academics policies and the various government educational reforms from the Babs Fafunwa's 6-3-3-4 to Ezekwezeli's 9-3-4, and now back to the 6-3-3-4. The college like its contemporaries has an array of college activities and has a hostel life incorporated with various extra-curricular activities which helps the all-round development of the students. With hostels named after Benin heroines, the college boasts of Adesuwa house clad in Blue, Emotan house adorn the yellow check, Eweka house in purple, Omigie house (a mix of various houses created to help ease the congestion in the other hostels), Moremi house wonderfully looking in their red check.

It also encourages respect and so combines both senior and junior students, and tries to reduce to the barest minimum the various cases of bullying that is not alien to systems run like this. The senior girl and the various prefects work hand-in-hand with the college staff to ensure a smooth running of the school.

Alumni
Federal Government Girls' College, Benin City has very strong alumni associations in the United Kingdom, United States, and Nigeria.

Photo Ggllery

References 

Girls' schools in Nigeria
Secondary schools in Edo State
Educational institutions established in 1973
1973 establishments in Nigeria
Education in Benin City